The first cabinet of Nicolae Crețulescu was the government of Romania from 24 June 1862 to 11 October 1863.

Ministers
The ministers of the cabinet were as follows:

President of the Council of Ministers:
Nicolae Crețulescu (24 June 1862 - 11 October 1863)
Minister of the Interior: 
Nicolae Crețulescu (24 June 1862 - 11 October 1863)
Minister of Foreign Affairs: 
Alexandru Cantacuzino (24 June - 30 September 1862)
Gen. Ioan G. Ghica (30 September 1862 - 17 August 1863)
Nicolae Rosetti-Bălănescu (17 August - 11 October 1863)
Minister of Finance:
Teodor Ghica (24 June - 12 July 1862)
(interim) Alexandru Cantacuzino (12 July - 30 September 1862)
Alexandru Cantacuzino (30 September 1862 - 16 March 1863)
(interim) Constantin I. Iliescu (16 March - 31 July 1863)
Constantin I. Iliescu (31 July - 11 October 1863)
Minister of Justice:
Dimitrie Cornea (24 June - 30 December 1862)
Nicolae Crețulescu (30 December 1862 - 14 June 1863)
Barbu Bellu (14 June - 8 August 1863)
(interim) Nicolae Crețulescu (8 - 15 August 1863)
Dimitrie P. Vioreanu (15 August - 11 October 1863)
Minister of Religious Affairs:
Gheorghe Crețeanu (24 June - 16 July 1862)
Nicolae D. Racoviță (16 July - 30 December 1862)
Gen. Christian Tell (30 December 1862 - 26 May 1863)
(interim) Alexandru Odobescu (26 May - 31 July 1863)
Alexandru Odobescu (31 July - 11 October 1863)
Minister of War:
Gen. Ioan G. Ghica (24 June - 30 September 1862)
Gen. Ioan E. Florescu (30 September 1862 - 11 October 1863)
Minister of Public Works:
Alexandru Em. Florescu (24 June - 7 July 1862)
(interim) Dimitrie Cornea (7 July - 11 October 1862)
Alexandru Ș. Catargiu (11 October 1862 - 11 October 1863)
Minister of Control:
Alexandru Ș. Catargiu (24 June - 11 October 1862)

References

Cabinets of Romania
Cabinets established in 1862
Cabinets disestablished in 1863
1862 establishments in Romania
1863 disestablishments in Romania